Dick Baker (1938 – August 1, 2001) was a Canadian racecar driver who was inducted into the Canadian Motorsport Hall of Fame in 2002 for his accomplishments in vintage racing. He was the founder of Can-Truck, a trucking company, and had been Chairman of the Board of the Canadian Motorsport Hall of Fame.

References

1938 births
2001 deaths
People from Prince Edward County, Ontario
Racing drivers from Ontario